Constantin Codrescu (5 September 1931 – 13 November 2022) was a Romanian actor. He appeared in more than thirty films since 1953.

Born in Huși, he was raised in northern Bukovina, but had to move to Bucharest after the region was annexed by the Soviet Union in 1940. 

In the early 1950s he was married to actress Valeria Gagialov, but some strange circumstances involving his mother (who tried to poison his wife) led to divorce. Afterwards he was married for five years to actress Margareta-Yvonne Butuc (later known as Marga Barbu); after divorcing her in 1959, he  married Adina Georgescu in 1963, but this marriage also did not last long. In 1972 he found employment at the Hungarian Theatre in Târgu Mureș, where he met and later married actress Ildiko Codrescu.

Codrescu died on 13 November 2022, at the age of 91.

Selected filmography

References

External links 

1931 births
2022 deaths
People from Huși
Romanian male film actors
Caragiale National University of Theatre and Film alumni
Recipients of the Order of Cultural Merit (Romania)
Knights of the Order of the Star of Romania
20th-century Romanian male actors
21st-century Romanian male actors